Cotton Jones (formerly The Cotton Jones Basket Ride) is an American indie folk band, with elements of psychedelic folk, dream pop, baroque pop, and Americana, based in Cumberland, Maryland and currently signed to Suicide Squeeze Records.

Michael Nau (born October 31, 1984) is the lead singer-songwriter and plays guitar, Whitney McGraw (born July 20, 1986) is on keyboards, organ, and electronic autoharp, Todd Gowans (born February 4, 1986) plays lead electric guitar, with Greg Bender on bass.

Albums

The River Strumming
On September 23, 2008, the band released their first LP, The River Strumming, through the indie label St. Ives. It was a hand-made package limited to only 300 copies and was described as a "delightful slab of fuzzed-out dream folk."

Paranoid Cocoon
On January 27, 2009, the band released their second LP, their debut for Suicide Squeeze Records, Paranoid Cocoon. It was described as a "weepy, reverb-drenched blend of Pacific Northwest, 1960s folk-pop, and heartland rock."

Tall Hours in the Glowstream
On August 24, 2010, the band released their third LP, Tall Hours in the Glowstream. It was described as "classic country music filtered through a dream-pop haze."

About the Game
On August 21, 2012, the band released About the Game, a 7" record limited to only 500 copies.

Mowing
On November 18, 2015, Michael Nau announced his solo debut Mowing, introducing the first single "Winter Beat" via SoundCloud. The album was made available for pre-order, limited to only 1,000 copies, shipping on February 8, 2016. The album's general release date was February 19, 2016.

Some Twist
On June 16, 2017, Michael Nau released his second solo album Some Twist. AllMusic described it as a "high-humidity set for long summer days, present or imagined" and Red & Black described it as "outer space road trip music...songs that feel unreal in their otherworldliness."

Discography

Band members

Current members
 Michael Nau 
 Whitney McGraw 
 Todd Gowans 
 Greg Bender

Touring members
 Chris Morris
 Bryan Martin
 Matt Smith

References

External links
Official Website
SuicideSqueeze.net

Indie rock musical groups from Maryland
Suicide Squeeze Records artists